Monachoides incarnatus (syn. Perforatella incarnata) is a species of air-breathing land snail in the terrestrial pulmonate gastropod mollusk family Hygromiidae, the hairy snails and their allies. 

Subspecies
 Monachoides incarnatus amatus (Stabile, 1859)
 Monachoides incarnatus incarnatus (O. F. Müller, 1774)
 Monachoides incarnatus welebitanus (L. Pfeiffer, 1848)

Distribution
This snail species is widespread in Europe, and most abundant in Central Europe. It can be found in the Czech Republic, Bulgaria, Netherlands, Poland, Slovakia, Ukraine, and many other countries.

Biology
This species of snail creates and uses love darts as part of its mating behavior.

The egg is 2 millimeters wide.

Conservation
This common species has stable populations facing no apparent threats, and no specific conservation actions are underway.

References

 Bank, R. A.; Neubert, E. (2017). Checklist of the land and freshwater Gastropoda of Europe. Last update: July 16th, 2017
 Sysoev, A. V. & Schileyko, A. A. (2009). Land snails and slugs of Russia and adjacent countries. Sofia/Moskva (Pensoft). 312 pp., 142 plates

External links
 [https://www.biodiversitylibrary.org/page/12893715  Müller, O. F. (1774). Vermium terrestrium et fluviatilium, seu animalium infusorium, Helminthicorum, et testaceorum, non marinorum, succincta historia. vol 2: I-XXXVI, 1-214, 10 unnumbered pages. Havniae et Lipsiae, apud Heineck et Faber, ex officina Molleriana., available online at https://www.biodiversitylibrary.org/page/12893715
page(s): 63]

Hygromiidae
Gastropods described in 1774
Taxa named by Otto Friedrich Müller